The Sanctuary Chapel of Mother Francesca Rubatto is a Roman Catholic chapel in Montevideo, Uruguay.

Held by the Capuchin Sisters of Mother Rubatto,  it is the shrine where the remains of Saint Francesca Rubatto are venerated. It is located in the neighbourhood of Belvedere, where Mother Rubatto performed most of her work.

References

Belvedere, Montevideo
Roman Catholic church buildings in Montevideo
Catholic pilgrimage sites
Romanesque Revival church buildings in Uruguay
Roman Catholic shrines in Uruguay
Roman Catholic chapels in Uruguay